Pavel Složil and Tomáš Šmíd were the defending champions but competed this year with different partners, with Složil teaming up with Jakob Hlasek and Šmíd teaming up with John Fitzgerald. Both pairs faced each other at the first round, with Hlasek and Složil winning the match 7–6, 6–7, 6–4. The pair eventually lost in the quarterfinals to Stefan Edberg and Slobodan Živojinović.

Edberg and Živojinović won the title by defeating Wojciech Fibak and Matt Mitchell 2–6, 6–3, 6–2 in the final.

Seeds

Draw

Draw

References

External links
 Official results archive (ATP)
 Official results archive (ITF)

1986 ABN World Tennis Tournament
1986 Grand Prix (tennis)